USS Prince (CVE-45) (originally named McClure, designated AVG-45 then later ACV-45) was an escort carrier laid down on 17 December 1942 by the Seattle-Tacoma Shipbuilding Corporation of Tacoma, Washington. She was renamed Prince on 13 November 1942 and launched on 18 May 1943. She was sponsored by Mrs. J. L. McGuigan, reclassified CVE-45 on 15 July 1943 and transferred to the United Kingdom under Lend-Lease on 17 October 1943.

Prince served the United Kingdom as HMS Rajah (D10). She was returned to the United States Navy at Norfolk, Virginia on 13 December 1946. She was struck from the Naval Vessel Registry on 7 February 1947 and delivered to her purchaser, Waterman Steamship Corporation, on 7 July. She became the merchant ship Drente (later renamed Lambros, then Ulysses) in 1948. She was scrapped in Taiwan in 1975.

Design and description
These ships were all larger and had a greater aircraft capacity than all the preceding American built escort carriers. They were also all laid down as escort carriers and not converted merchant ships. Propulsion was provided by two boilers connected to a steam turbine, which was connected to one shaft, giving 9,350 brake horsepower (SHP).

The ship's armament comprised: two 4"/50, 5"/38 or 5"/51 Dual Purpose guns in single mounts, sixteen 40 mm Bofors anti-aircraft guns in twin mounts and twenty 20 mm Oerlikon anti-aircraft cannons in single mounts. Each ship had a maximum capacity of twenty-four aircraft which could be a mixture of Grumman Martlet, Vought F4U Corsair or Hawker Sea Hurricane fighters and Fairey Swordfish or Grumman Avenger anti-submarine aircraft.

Notes

References

External links

Ships built in Tacoma, Washington
1943 ships
Ruler-class escort carriers